Artur Langowski Terezan (born 8 May 1991) is a Brazilian athlete specialising in the 400 metres hurdles. He finished fourth at the 2015 Summer Universiade.

His personal best in the event is 49.18 seconds achieved in Bragança Paulista in 2018.

International competitions

1Did not start in the final

References

1991 births
Living people
Brazilian male hurdlers
World Athletics Championships athletes for Brazil
Competitors at the 2014 South American Games
Competitors at the 2015 Summer Universiade
Competitors at the 2017 Summer Universiade
Troféu Brasil de Atletismo winners
21st-century Brazilian people